The 2013 FIBA Under-19 World Championship (Czech: Mistrovství světa FIBA do 19 let 2013) was the 11th edition of the FIBA U19 World Championship, the biennial international men's youth basketball championship contested by the U19 national teams of the member associations of FIBA. It was hosted by the Czech Republic from 27 June to 7 July 2013.

The United States won their fifth title by defeating Serbia 82–68 in the final.

Format
Teams played a round robin in the preliminary round, with the top three teams advancing to the main round. The teams played against the teams from the other groups. The top four teams advanced to the knockout stage.

Qualified teams

Preliminary round
The draw for the tournament was held on 15 January 2013 in Prague, Czech Republic.

Group A

|}

Group B

|}

Group C

|}

Group D

|}

Eighth final round

Group E

|}

Group F

|}

Classification round

13th–16th place

|}

9th–12th place

Semifinals

Eleventh-place game

Ninth-place game

Final round 

5th place bracket

Quarterfinals

Classification 5–8

Semifinals

Seventh-place game

Fifth-place game

Bronze-medal game

Final

Final standings

Awards

All-Tournament Team
  Vasilije Micić
  Dante Exum
  Aaron Gordon
  Dario Šarić
  Jahlil Okafor

Referees
FIBA named 25 referees that officiated at the tournament.
  David Joao Domingos Manuel
  Leandro Nicolas Lezcano
  Christopher Antony Reid
  Guilherme Locatelli
  Perry Stothart
  Nan Ye
  Robert Vyklický
  Nicolas Maestre
  Panagiotis Anastopoulos
  Roberto Chiari
  Naohiko Uchihara
  Marvan Egho
  Naftal Candido Chongo
  Ricor Buaron
  Grzegorz Ziemblicki
  Roberto Vazquez
  Alexey Davydov
  Milija Vojinović
  Sašo Petek
  Benjamin Jiménez Trujillo
  Rüştü Nuran
  Borys Shulga
  Alejandro Sánchez Varela
  Steven Marquis Anderson
  Roberto Oliveros

References

External links
 Official website
 2013 FIBA U19 World Championship
   

2013
FIBA Under-19 World Championship
FIBA Under-19 World Championship
International youth basketball competitions hosted by the Czech Republic